The Afanasievo culture, or Afanasevo culture (Afanasevan culture) ( Afanas'yevskaya kul'tura), is the earliest known archaeological culture of south Siberia, occupying the Minusinsk Basin and the Altai Mountains during the eneolithic era,  3300 to 2500 BCE. It is named after a nearby mountain, Gora Afanasieva in what is now Bogradsky District, Khakassia, Russia.

David W. Anthony believes that the Afanasevan population was descended from people who migrated c. 3700–3300 BCE across the Eurasian Steppe from the pre-Yamnaya Repin culture of the Don-Volga region. Because of its geographical location and dating, Anthony and earlier scholars such as Leo Klejn, J. P. Mallory and Victor H. Mair have linked the Afanasevans to the Proto-Tocharian language.

Dating
Conventional archaeological understanding tended to date at around 2000–2500 BC. However radiocarbon gave dates as early as 3705 BC on wooden tools and  2874 BC on human remains. The earliest of these dates have now been rejected, giving a date of around 3300 BC for the start of the culture.

Culture
Mass graves were not usual for this culture. Afanasievo cemeteries include both single and small collective burials with the deceased usually flexed on their back in a pit. The burial pits are arranged in rectangular, sometimes circular, enclosures marked by stone walls. It has been argued that the burials represent family burial plots with four or five enclosures constituting the local social group.

The Afanasievo economy included cattle, sheep, and goat. Horse remains, either wild or domestic, have also been found. The Afanasievo people became the first food-producers in the area. Tools were manufactured from stone (axes, arrowheads), bone (fish-hooks, points) and antler. Among the antler pieces are objects that have been identified as possible cheek-pieces for horses. Artistic representations of wheeled vehicles found in the area has been attributed to the Afanasievo culture. Ornaments of copper, silver and gold have also been found.

Physical anthropology

Genetics

The analysis of the full genome of Afanasievo individuals has shown that they were genetically very close to the Yamnaya population of the Pontic–Caspian steppe. The Afanasievo and Yamnaya populations were much more similar to each other than to groups geographically located between the two (which unlike Afanasievo samples carried a large amount of ancestry from eastern Siberian hunter-gatherers). This indicates that the Afanasievo culture was brought to the Altai region via migration from the western Eurasian steppe, which initially occurred with little admixture from local populations. The genetic closeness of the Yamnaya and Afanasievo populations is also mirrored in the uniparental haplogroups, especially in the predominance of the Y-chromosome haplogroup R1b.

From the Altai mountains, steppe-derived Afanasievo ancestry spread to the east into Mongolia and to the south into Xinjiang. Afanasievo-related ancestry disappeared in the course of the Bronze Age in the Altai region and Mongolia, being replaced or absorbed by the arrival of migrating populations from the east and southwest. In Xinjiang, Afanasievo-related ancestry persisted at least into the late first millennium BCE.

Diseases
At Afanasevo Gora, two strains of Yersinia pestis have been extracted from human teeth. One is dated 2909–2679 BCE; the other, 2887–2677 BCE. Both are from the same (mass) grave of seven people, and are presumed near-contemporary. This strain's genes express flagellin, which triggers the human immune response; so it was not a bubonic plague.

Possible links to other cultures
Because of its numerous traits attributed to the early Indo-Europeans, like metal-use, horses and wheeled vehicles, and cultural relations with Kurgan steppe cultures, the Afanasevans are believed to have been Indo-European-speaking. Genetic studies have demonstrated a discontinuity between Afanasievo and the succeeding Siberian-originating Okunevo culture, as well as genetic differences between Afanasievo and the Tarim mummies.

Numerous scholars have suggested that the Afanasevo culture was responsible for the introduction of metallurgy to China.

Successors
The Afanasevo culture was succeeded by the Okunev culture, which is considered as an extension of the Paleosiberian local non-Indo-European forest culture into the region. The Okunev culture nevertheless displays influences from the earlier Afanasievo culture. The region was subsequently occupied by the Andronovo, Karasuk, Tagar and Tashtyk cultures, respectively.

Allentoft and coauthors (2015) study also confirms that the Afanasevo culture was replaced by the second wave of Indo-European migrations from the Andronovo culture during late Bronze Age and early Iron Age. The Yamnaya and Afanasevo cultures were also found to be genetically distinct from the Andronovo culture.

Notes

References

Further reading
H. P. Francfort, The Archeology of Protohistoric Central Asia and the Problems of Identifying Indo-European and Uralic-Speaking populations (review ) in : Persée 2003: Archéologie de l'Asie intérieure de l'âge du bronze à l'âge du fer

 

Einführung in die Ethnologie Zentralasiens Marion Linska, Andrea Handl, Gabriele Rasuly-Paleczek (2003) (.doc version)

Nomadic groups in Eurasia
Chalcolithic cultures of Asia
Bronze Age cultures of Asia
Archaeological cultures of China
Archaeological cultures in Kazakhstan
Archaeological cultures in Mongolia
Archaeological cultures in Russia
Archaeological cultures of Northern Asia
Indo-European archaeological cultures
Tocharians